is a Japanese comedy manga series by Kōji Kumeta. It was serialized in Kodansha's Monthly Shōnen Magazine from December 2015 to July 2020, and has been collected in twelve tankōbon volumes. An anime television series adaptation produced by Ajia-do Animation Works aired from April to June 2020. An anime compilation film premiered in July 2021.

Plot
Kakushi Goto draws ecchi manga for a living; worried that fact would alienate his daughter Hime from him, he swears never to let it out.

Characters

Gotō household

Kakushi is a mangaka who runs his own company, G-PRO. Being that his primary work involves ecchi, he is determined to keep his mangaka career a secret from his daughter, Hime. Kakushi is a single father, his wife having disappeared in an accident off the coast of Japan. His name is a pun on one of the Japanese words for 'secret' (かくしごと, kakushigoto). In the present, he has been in a coma for a year after suffering from an accident at his warehouse job.

Hime is a 10-year-old sprightly elementary school student and daughter to Kakushi. She is also depicted as an 18-year-old high school student in flash-forward segments, who knows of her father's secret, and has been waiting for him to wake up from his coma. Her name is a pun on one of the Japanese words for 'secret' (ひめゴト, himegoto).

G-PRO

Aogu is Kakushi's chief assistant at G-PRO. He often requires instructions from other people, and his name is a reference to this fact (shiji wo aoku, 'ask for instructions').

Rasuna is an assistant at G-PRO. She is named after the phrase don't drop ink! (すみ たらす な！, sumi tarasu na!).

Ami is an assistant at G-PRO. She generally sports a flat, uninterested demeanour; she also keeps secrets of her own, such as her mangaka pen name. Her name is a reference to the kakeiami (カケアミ) style of cross-hatching.

Kakeru is the newest assistant at G-PRO; his primary duty is to erase mistakes on the manga manuscripts. His name is a reference to erasing, or literally using an eraser (消しゴムかける, keshigomukakeru).

Tomaruin is the long-suffering editor at Weekly Shōnen Magazine responsible for liaisoning with the G-PRO firm. He repeatedly drops off manga materials at the Goto home, threatening to reveal Kakushi's secret to his daughter. He is regarded as a ditz, and in one episode, mistaken for a pervert; however, he generally means well. He has a crush on Nadila. His name is a reference to the phrase tomaru insatsuki (stop the presses).

Other characters

Nadila is an Indonesian migrant worker who occasionally comes to clean the Goto home. She teaches Hime how to cook Indonesian food, befuddling her father. In another segment, Tomaruin mistakes her for a dukun.

Imashigata is Kakushi's wealthy father-in-law, who has been at loggerheads with him seemingly ever since his daughter passed away. However, it is shown he still cares for Hime, going so far as to buying her a grand piano when she wants to practice.

Media

Manga
Kakushigoto: My Dad's Secret Ambition is written and illustrated by Kōji Kumeta. The manga started in Monthly Shōnen Magazine on December 5, 2015. In March 2020, it was announced that the manga would end with the release of its twelfth tankōbon volume. The manga finished on July 6, 2020.

In March 2020, Kodansha USA announced the acquisition of the manga for an English language digital release, with the first volume being released on March 17, 2020.

Anime
An anime television series adaptation was announced on the tenth volume of the manga on November 15, 2019. The series was animated by Ajia-do Animation Works and directed by Yūta Murano, with Takashi Aoshima handling series composition, Shuuhei Yamamoto designing the characters, and Yukari Hashimoto composing the series' music. It aired from April 2 to June 18, 2020 on BS-NTV, AT-X, Tokyo MX, and SUN.

Funimation acquired the series and streamed it on their website, AnimeLab, and Wakanim, as well as producing an English dub. Following Sony's acquisition of Crunchyroll, the series was moved to Crunchyroll.

The first volume of Blu-ray & DVD contains a 12-page newly drawn bonus manga by the author.

Film
On December 12, 2020, it was announced that the series would receive a theatrical compilation film.  The film premiered on July 9, 2021. Funimation streamed the film.

Notes

References

External links
  
 

Ajia-do Animation Works
Anime series based on manga
Comedy anime and manga
Crunchyroll anime
Kodansha manga
Kōji Kumeta
Manga creation in anime and manga
Shōnen manga
Slice of life anime and manga